Mizhineerppoovukal is a 1986 Indian Malayalam-language drama film directed by Kamal (in his directorial debut) and written by John Paul, starring Mohanlal and Urvasi. The music was composed by M. K. Arjunan. The plot follows the life of a womaniser, Richard (Mohanlal), who along with his friends used to seduce, gang rape and kill girls. It was the last film of Kottarakkara Sreedharan Nair.

Plot

It is the story of a womaniser, Richard, along with his friends, who seduce girls and finally kill them after gang rape. But destiny had different plans as the same womaniser really falls in love with a girl for the first time and he reaches the same tourist spot for their honeymoon. His same friends also partying there, find them.

Cast
Mohanlal as Richard
Urvasi as Aswathi Varma
Lizy as Sophia Richard
 Minu Mohan as Betty Elizabeth Francis
Innocent as Phalgunan Pillai
Thilakan as Dr. Hameed
Nedumudi Venu as Ayilyam thirunal Kumara Varma Thamburan
Ashokan
Bahadoor as Kariachen
Valsala Menon as Kuttimaluamma
Kottarakkara Sreedharan Nair as Father
Siddique
Babu Antony as Richard's friend

Soundtrack 
The music was composed by M. K. Arjunan and the lyrics were written by R. K. Damodaran. The song "Chandra Kiranathin Chandanamunnum" from the film was a classic hit of the era.

References

External links
 

1980 films
1980s Malayalam-language films
Films directed by Kamal (director)